Karingozhackal Mani Mani (30 January 1933 – 9 April 2019) was an Indian politician and the chairman of Kerala Congress (M), one of the main factions of Kerala Congress, a party born in the Travancore or Central South Kerala region which focused on the well-being of farmers.

He holds the records of having presented the highest number of budgets (thirteen) in the Kerala Legislative Assembly as Finance Minister and also as the longest-serving member of the Kerala Legislative Assembly. He holds the distinction of having been the longest-serving minister in the Government of Kerala to date and for having continuously represented Pala legislative constituency since its inception in 1965 until his death in 2019.

Early life
He was born in a Syrian Catholic family  to Karingozhackal Thomas Mani and Aliyamma. He started his political career by being the Congress president of Marangattupilly ward. He was married to Congress veteran P. T. Chacko's cousin, Kuttiyamma, and has six children: five daughters—Elsa, Sally, Anie, Tessy and Smitha—and one son, Jose K. Mani.

Political career

Overview
Mani practiced as a lawyer before entering into politics as an active member of the Indian National Congress. He served as the Kottayam DCC (District Congress Committee) Secretary from 1960 till 1964. 
He was minister for Home Affairs (April 1977 to September 1978 and again from October 1978 to July 1979).
He was minister for Finance and Law (January 1980 - October 1981, December 1981-March 1982 and again from May 1982-March 1982-March 1986), Irrigation and law (1987), Revenue and Law (1987), Revenue and Law (June 1991 to March 1996), Revenue and Law (2001 to 2006). He has never lost an election in the Legislative Assembly.

As Member of Kerala Congress (1965-1979)
Mani joined Kerala Congress in 1965 right before Kerala Legislative Assembly election. He was elected to the Kerala Legislative Assembly for the first time in 1965 from the Palai Assembly Constituency (now Pala constituency) of Kottayam district, he won all the twelve elections that followed in 1967, 1970, 1977, 1980, 1982, 1987, 1991, 1996, 2001, 2006, 2011 and 2016.

Theory of the Toiling Class
K. M. Mani, was the man behind the ‘Theory of the Toiling Class’. The theory, an all-purpose political theory, made him acceptable to everyone. According to him, farmers, agriculture labourers and other workers belong to the category of working class and they should stand together to ensure their rights. As per his vision, farmers and agriculture labourers are two sides of the same coin and their union was essential for the upliftment of the agriculture sector, which proved right in the later years, especially in the central Travancore. The financial resolution presented by Mani at the party’s Aluva conference in 1973 was a prelude to this theory.  Mani coined this theory at a time when the Communist theory classified the people as labourers and rich men. The significance of Mani was that even the Left was forced to accept this theory when it decided to bring farmers in to their fold. Interestingly, Mani’s economic policies and toiling class theory were instrumental in the growth of Kerala Congress.

Kerala congress (M) 
In 1979 he parted ways with Kerala congress leader P.J. Joseph to form a new party called Kerala Congress (Mani).

However in 1985 Kerala congress leaders K. M. Mani (from Kerala Congress (M)), P. J. Joseph from Kerala Congress (Joseph), 
R. Balakrishna Pillai (from Kerala Congress (B)) and their parties merged forming the united Kerala Congress. This party split in 1987.

He lost the Chief Minister post of Kerala in 1979 when P. K. Vasudevan Nair resigned. Then C. H. Mohammed Koya became Chief Minister and after two months Mani withdrew his party's support on that government and Koya resigned. Now Mani got another chance to become the Chief Minister, but with the interference of Congress party the Assembly was dissolved in favor of all those who did not wish him to become the Chief Minister.

Mani was not among the founders of the Kerala Congress. In the faction-ridden Kerala Congress, Mani was accused by political foes as having engineered many a split in the party.

He is the longest-serving Member of the Legislative Assembly (MLA) in the history of Kerala Legislative Assembly.

In a public function organized at Ramapuram, Palai in October 2009, M. M. Jacob, senior Congress leader, and former Meghalaya Governor said that he advised Mani in 1965 to contest the Congress party label and if it was done Mani would have become the Chief Minister very early. Again he said that now Mani was fully eligible for the post of Chief Minister.

In 2009, Mani got the P. R. Francis award for the best social worker of Kerala. After presenting the award to Mani in a function organized at Thrissur, Congress leader Oommen Chandy invited him to Congress party. But Mani rejected.

On 2 November 2009, P. C. George's faction of the Kerala Congress decided to merge with Kerala Congress (M). This was a major breakthrough in Kerala politics since George criticized Mani for many years.

On 30 April 2010, P. J. Joseph resigned his ministerial post and declared that his Kerala Congress was going to merge with Kerala Congress (M). Political analysts have estimated that this decision would help Kerala Congress to sweep almost all the assembly seats in Central Travancore region and would create a new diversion in Kerala politics.

His initiative of the Karunya Lottery Benevolent Scheme claims financial help for poor people from lottery revenue. His Theory of the Toiling Class was presented in the British Parliament. Based on Kerala High court's comments on Mani's involvement in Kerala BAR license scam and bribery case, he had to resign from the post of Finance minister of Kerala on 10 November 2015.
On 9 May 2016, Mani recorded his 13th consecutive victory from his home constituency of Palai by defeating the then Left front candidate Mani C. Kappan by a lead of 4703 votes.

Bar Bribery scam
On 10 Nov 2015, Mani was pulled down from the position as Minister of Finance and Law Kerala state, as he was accused of being a part of bar bribery scam. He was the Chairman of the Empowered Committee of State Finance Ministers on Goods and Services Tax (GST). Based on Kerala High court's comments on Mani's involvement in Kerala BAR license scam and bribery case, he resigned from the post of Finance minister on 10 November 2015, after a lot of heated political debate. The resignation has come after a day-long political turmoil in Kerala capital.

Literary works
He is the author of Fiscal Problems of Kerala – Causes and Remedial Measures, The People's Socialism, and The Eighth Five Year Plan – An alternative approach. He presented paper on India and Globalisation: Asian Economic Community – Need of the Day at the National Seminar held in New Delhi on 22 December 1994.

Death 
He died on 9 April 2019 in Lakeshore Hospital Kochi due to Chronic Obstructive Pulmonary Disease.

References

External links

 Kerala Congress (M) leader KM Mani passes away..

People from Pala, Kerala
Malayali politicians
Kerala politicians
1933 births
2019 deaths
Kerala Congress (M) politicians
Indian National Congress politicians from Kerala
Corruption in Kerala
Kerala MLAs 1967–1970
Kerala MLAs 1970–1977
Kerala MLAs 1977–1979
Kerala MLAs 1980–1982
Kerala MLAs 1982–1987
Kerala MLAs 1987–1991
Kerala MLAs 1991–1996
Kerala MLAs 1996–2001
Kerala MLAs 2001–2006
Kerala MLAs 2006–2011
Kerala MLAs 2011–2016
Kerala MLAs 2016–2021
Respiratory disease deaths in India
Deaths from chronic obstructive pulmonary disease
Kerala Congress politicians
Syro-Malabar Catholics